Epistolary means "in the form of a letter or letters", and may refer to:
 The adjectival form of epistle
 Epistolary, a Christian liturgical book containing set readings for church services from the New Testament Epistles
 Epistolary novel
 Epistolary poem

See also
 Epistulae (disambiguation)